David Royle may refer to:

 David Royle (actor), an actor who portrayed Edgar 'Wieldy' Wield in the Dalziel and Pascoe television series
 David Royle, a Labour councillor for Fallowfield